Ace of Clubs is a musical written, composed and directed by Noël Coward. The show is set in a 1949 London nightclub called "Ace of Clubs".  Nightclub singer Pinkie Leroy falls in love with a sailor.  Pinkie and her lover get mixed up with gangsters, a lost package and a missing diamond necklace. In the end, the police arrest the perpetrators, and Pinkie gets her man.

The musical premiered at the Palace Theatre, Manchester, on 16 May 1950, followed by more tryouts at the Liverpool Empire Theatre and the Birmingham Alhambra Theatre. It transferred to the Cambridge Theatre, London, on 7 July 1950, where it ran for 211 performances until 6 January 1951. The cast included Pat Kirkwood, Sylvia Cecil, Graham Payn, Jean Carson and Myles Eason. Mantovani was the musical director. Stage and costume designs were by Gladys Calthrop.

Despite its modest run, Ace of Clubs contained several songs that survived independently, in Coward's later cabaret acts and elsewhere, including "Sail Away" and "I Like America." A CD of the original London cast recording was released in 2004.

Background
After the Second World War Coward strove for a time to regain his pre-war popularity. His 1945 revue Sigh No More ran for only 213 performances in the West End, and the failure of his musical Pacific 1860 in 1946–47 was in contrast to the success of the show that followed it at Drury Lane, Rodgers and Hammerstein's Oklahoma!, which ran for more than ten times as long. Ace of Clubs was one of several other less successful Coward works of the period.

Cast

Elaine – Bubbly Rogers
Rita Marbury – Sylvia Cecil
Benny Lucas – Raymond Young
Sammy Blake – Robb Stewart
Felix Fulton – Myles Eason
Ace of Clubs Girls:
Dawn O'Hara – Sylvia Verney
Doreen Harvey – Margaret Miles
Sunny Claire – June Whitfield
Ruby Fowler – Erica Yorke
Greta Hughes – Pamela Devis
Betty Clements – Lorna Drewes
Mimi Joshua – Vivien Merchant
June April – Lisbeth Kearns
Baby Belgrave – Jean Carson
Hercules Brothers – Victor Harman, Ronald Francis, Stanley Howlett
Joseph Snyder – Elwyn Brook-Jones

Gus – Patrick Westwood
Pinkie Leroy – Pat Kirkwood
Harry Hornby – Graham Payn
Clarice – Eileen Tatler
Eva – Renee Hill
Yvonne Hall – Jean Inglis
Mavis Dean – Gail Kendall
Detective-Inspector Warrilove – Jack Lambert
Policeman – Michael Darbyshire
Mr Price – Philip Rose
Mrs Price – Stella White
Juvenile delinquents – Peter Tuddenham, Colin Kemball, Norman Warwick
First plain-clothes Man – Manfred Priestley
Second plain-clothes Man – Christopher Calthrop
Drummer – Don Fitz Stanford
Waiters – George Selfe, Richard Gill, Jacques Gautier
Night club habitués and visitors 

Source: Theatrical Companion to Coward.

Synopsis
Benny runs the Soho nightclub "The Ace of Clubs" for the owner, Rita.  Felix, the compère, introduces the club's girls, who perform their opening number.  Benny plans the pickup of a parcel with a gangster, Smiling Snyder.  The parcel is in the cloakroom wrapped in a raincoat.  When Snyder forcibly steals a kiss from Pinkie Leroy, the club's star, in the middle of her act, a sailor named Harry punches Snyder, who draws his gun and fires.  Pinkie takes the raincoat to cover her skimpy costume and escapes with Harry.

Harry and Pinkie discover the parcel in the raincoat, but it falls out and Harry finds it after Pinkie goes back to the club.  Benny is already looking for the missing parcel, and Rita, who is in love with him, realises that Benny is involved with the gangsters.  At rehearsal the next afternoon, Harry comes by to see Pinkie. Detective-lnspector Warrilove arrives to investigate a jewel robbery and shooting.  He suspects Snyder.  Benny discourages Pinkie from becoming involved with Harry.  That evening Snyder and his associate, Guy, kidnap Harry during the show, but he escapes.  Pinkie, afraid for Harry's safety, promises Benny that she will get the parcel.  Harry is hidden, and after Benny leaves, he and Pinkie meet.

The next day, Harry return with the parcel, suggesting that they give it to the police.  Pinkie disagrees, and they argue.  That evening, one of the girls mistakes the parcel for her birthday present and opens it, finding the purloined necklace.  Snyder and Gus pick up the parcel in exchange for cash.  Rita hears that the stolen necklace has been traced to the club.  She asks the gangsters to leave.  In the club, Warrilove notices the necklace, which the birthday girl is wearing, and he follows her.  Snyder and Gus open the parcel to find the birthday present, a pair of falsies.  They return to the club, and Warrilove catches them.  All ends happily for Benny and Rita as well as Pinkie and Harry.

Musical numbers

Act 1
 "Top of the Morning" – Baby and Ace of Clubs Girls
 "My Kind of Man" – Pinkie
 "This Could be True" – Pinkie and Harry
 "Nothing Can Last For Ever" – Rita
 "Something About a Sailor" – Harry
 "I'd Never, Never Know" – Pinkie
 "Three Juvenile Delinquents" – Juvenile Delinquents
 "Sail Away" – Harry
 "Josephine" – Pinkie
 Reprise: "My Kind of Man" – Pinkie
 "Would You Like to Stick a Pin in my Balloon?" – Ace of Clubs Girls

Act 2
 "In a Boat on a Lake with My Darling" – Sextet
 "I Like America" – Harry and Ace of Clubs Girls
 "Why Does Love Get in the Way?" – Pinkie 
 "Three Juvenile Delinquents" Juvenile Delinquents 
 "Evening in Summer" – Rita
 Reprise: "Sail Away" – Harry
 *Time for Baby's Bottle" – Baby, Yvonne, Mavis
 "Chase Me, Charlie" – Pinkie
 Reprise: "Nothing Can Last For Ever" – Rita
 Reprise: "My Kind of Man" – Pinkie

Source: Theatrical Companion to Coward.

Critical reaction
The Times thought that Coward had striven too hard for popular success with his score: "In spite of the mixed reception it is possible that Ace of Clubs, for all its crudity and its slightly old-fashioned air, will give a great many people what they consider lively entertainment. But Mr Coward’s usual public will feel that he has temporarily deserted them." The Manchester Guardian was more favourable, calling the show "essentially a good-tempered frolic ... unlikely to knock spots off Oklahoma but it is in essence not only more genial, but more intelligent." It praised Coward's protégé Graham Payn, who "dances with consummate grace ... singularly fresh and boyish", adding, whether innocently or not, "Benevolent Uncle Noel has found a first-class nephew".

Notes, references and sources

Notes

References

Sources

1950 musicals
British musicals
Musicals by Noël Coward
Musicals set in London
Plays set in the 1940s